Ada María Magdalena Sierra (born 25 June 1966) is an Argentine architect and politician who served as a National Deputy from 2017 to 2021, elected in Buenos Aires Province. A member of the Justicialist Party, she was elected in 2017 as part of Unidad Ciudadana. Sierra previously served as a member of the Buenos Aires Province Senate from 2015 to 2017, representing the Third Electoral Section. Since 2021, she has been a member of the City Council of Avellaneda, a post she previously held as well.

Early and personal life
Sierra was born on 25 June 1966 in Buenos Aires. She studied architecture at the University of Buenos Aires, graduating in 2007. She is married to Jorge Ferraresi, former intendente of Avellaneda and current Minister of Territorial Development and Habitat in the cabinet of Alberto Fernández. Sierra and Ferraresi have two children.

Political career
Sierra was Undersecretary of Municipal Planning in Avellaneda from 2009 to 2013, during her husband's first term as mayor. In 2013, she ran for a seat in the Avellaneda City Council, as part of the Front for Victory list; she was elected. In the 2015 provincial elections, Sierra was elected as Provincial Senator for the Third Electoral Section.

Sierra ran for a seat in the Argentine Chamber of Deputies in the 2017 legislative election; she was the 11th candidate in the Unidad Ciudadana list in Buenos Aires Province. The Unidad Ciudadana list received 36.28% of the votes, and Sierra made it past the D'Hondt cut to be elected. She was sworn in on 6 December 2017.

As a national deputy, Sierra formed part of the parliamentary commissions on Habitat and Urban Planning, Addiction Prevention, Sports, Disabilities, Women and Diversity, Municipal Affairs, and Public Works. She was a supporter of the 2020 Voluntary Interruption of Pregnancy bill, which legalized abortion in Argentina.

Ahead of the 2021 legislative election, Sierra was confirmed as one of the candidates in the Frente de Todos list to the Avellaneda City Council.

Electoral history

References

External links

Living people
1966 births
Architects from Buenos Aires
Argentine women architects
Politicians from Buenos Aires
People from Avellaneda Partido
Members of the Argentine Chamber of Deputies elected in Buenos Aires Province
Women members of the Argentine Chamber of Deputies
Members of the Buenos Aires Province Senate
Justicialist Party politicians
University of Buenos Aires alumni
21st-century Argentine politicians
21st-century Argentine women politicians